Esteban Arias (born August 26, 1982) is an American former soccer player of Mexican heritage.

Career

College
Arias began his college soccer career at Albertus Magnus College in 2001. After one year there he transferred to the University of Connecticut, where he played in 54 games in three seasons and managed 1 goal and 7 assists.

Professional
Arias was selected in the fourth round (38th overall) in the 2005 MLS SuperDraft by Chivas. He made his professional debut for Chivas on July 9, 2005, in a 5-1 win over Real Salt Lake, and went on to make 19 appearances and score 1 goal in his two years with the team, before being waived at the end of the 2006 season.

Arias signed with his home town team, Bakersfield Brigade of the USL Premier Development League, in 2008.

References

External links
Chivas USA bio

1982 births
Living people
American soccer players
American sportspeople of Mexican descent
Association football defenders
Bakersfield Brigade players
Chivas USA draft picks
Chivas USA players
UConn Huskies men's soccer players
Major League Soccer players
Soccer players from California
Sportspeople from Bakersfield, California
USL League Two players
Albertus Magnus College alumni